Harmony Grove High School is a public junior/senior high school that provides comprehensive secondary education for students in grades seven through twelve in Haskell, Arkansas (with a Benton postal address), United States. A part of the Harmony Grove School District, the school is often referred to as Benton Harmony Grove High School based on the postal address stating "Benton".

Academics 
The assumed course of study for students follow the Smart Core curriculum developed by the Arkansas Department of Education (ADE). Students complete regular (core and elective) and career focus courses and exams and may select Advanced Placement (AP) coursework and exams that provide an opportunity for college credit. The school is accredited by the ADE.

Extracurricular activities 
The mascot and athletic emblem for Harmony Grove High School is the Cardinal with red and white serving as school colors.

Athletics 
For 2012–2016 school years, the school participates in interscholastic competition within the 3A Classification and 3A-5 Conference administered by the Arkansas Activities Association (AAA) in such sports as football, soccer (boys/girls), golf (boys/girls), cross country (boy/girls), basketball, baseball, softball, and competitive cheer.

Benton Harmony Grove won the state softball championship for three consecutive years (2002, 2003, 2004).

Notable alumni 
 Jimmy "Red" Parker—American football coach who started the school's football program in 2009.

References

External links

 Harmony Grove School District website

Public high schools in Arkansas
Schools in Saline County, Arkansas